Uvarovka is a rural locality (a village) in Beloozersky Selsoviet, Gafuriysky District, Bashkortostan, Russia. The population was 10 as of 2010. There is 1 street.

Geography 
Uvarovka is located 27 km northwest of Krasnousolsky (the district's administrative centre) by road. Daryino is the nearest rural locality.

References 

Rural localities in Gafuriysky District